Iain Baxter (4 December 1948 – 29 July 2015) was a Scottish curler.

He was also 1978 Scottish Mixed Curling champion and two-time Scottish senior men's champion (2002, 2003).

Teams

Men's

Mixed

Personal life
His brother Colin is also a curler and Iain's teammate. Their parents, father Bobby and mother Mabel, were curlers too.

References

External links
 

1948 births
2015 deaths
Scottish male curlers
Scottish curling champions
Curlers from Edinburgh